The EMD SW1 is a  diesel-electric switcher locomotive built by General Motors' Electro-Motive Corporation (later Division) between December 1938 and November 1953. Final assembly was at EMD's plant at LaGrange (McCook) Illinois. The SW1 was the second generation of  switcher from EMD, succeeding the SC (cast frame) and SW (welded frame). The most significant change from those earlier models was the use of an engine of EMD's own design, the then-new 567 engine, here in  V6 form. 661 locomotives of this design were built, with a gap in production between March 1943 and September 1945 due to World War II.

The SW1 was the start of a long line of SW series switchers produced by EMD. It was complemented by the SW7 in 1949 and the SW8 in 1950. SW1 production ceased in November 1953, with its replacement, the equally powerful SW600, starting production in February 1954.

Locomotive name 
EMD arrived at the name SW1 based on the locomotive's power (S for 600 hp) and frame design (W for welded), and the number 1 was added to distinguish the new design from the previous EMD SW. As new and more powerful SW designs emerged in the 1950s, the SW name evolved to instead stand for "switcher."

Engine and powertrain
The SW1 introduced a 6-cylinder version of the 567 (later 567A) series engine to EMC/EMD switchers. Developing  at 800 rpm, this engine remained in production until 1966. A D.C. generator provides power to four motors, two on each truck, in a B-B arrangement. The SW1, like most EMD switchers, uses the AAR type A switcher truck. EMC/EMD had built all its  components since 1939.

Production changes 
Several changes were made to the SW1 over its production life. Internally, the post-war locomotives used the 567A engine.

Externally, the two center cab windows over the hood, which were curved to follow the roofline originally, became flat-topped after mid-1950. Another external difference is the taper of the hood to the cab, which was a two-stage taper in earlier units but became a single taper in later production. Very early locomotives were delivered with a stubby exhaust stack, but this did not lift the diesel exhaust sufficiently clear of crew visibility. All later units were delivered with EMD's standard conical switcher stack, while early units were generally modified with taller stacks too. Early locomotives had a single large headlight, while later had twin sealed-beam headlights.

Original owners 

 There were 7 units built as EMD demonstrators: #152 (to Scullin Steel #6), 700 (to Manufacturers' Junction Railway #7), 755 (to Inland Steel #51), 804 (to Southern Pacific Railroad #1000, pictured above), 905 (to Central of Georgia #1), 906 (to Western Pacific Railroad #501), 911 (to Great Lakes Steel #11)
Owego and Harford Railway was still operating one SW1 for switching duties in their yard as of 2010, sitting derelict in a railyard in Owego, NY, as of 2019 
As of 2013, Amtrak still has one SW1 on their roster. #737 is used for switching chores at the Wilmington Delaware shops.
As of 2021, Metra commuter rail rosters one SW1. It is used for Yard Service and power on work trains on the Metra Electric and Rock Island lines. It was originally built in 1945 for the Rock Island. Metra used to operate a second SW1, built in 1939, but sold it in June 2021 via online auction for $45,000 due to an internal engine failure. The unit built in 1939 was rumored to be one of the oldest operating diesels in Illinois and the oldest operating locomotive in the U.S. that was not preserved.

Preservation 

Andersen Windowalls 3110 is preserved in operational condition at the Minnesota Transportation Museum. It was previously Norfolk and Western Railway 3110 and originally Wabash Railroad 110, built in June 1949.
Arkansas–Oklahoma Railroad 536 is in operational condition and in regular freight service.  It was previously Chicago, Rock Island and Pacific 536 and is painted in a Rock Island inspired paint scheme.
Baltimore and Ohio 8408 is preserved at the Wilmington and Western Railroad in operational condition.
Billings Grain Terminal 84, built as Chicago, Burlington and Quincy 9139 in 1939, was purchased by railroad operator and leasing firm St Johns River Companies in 2022 with the goal of restoring the locomotive into operating condition. After the formation of the Burlington Northern in 1970, 9139 was renumbered to 84, where it served for 5 years before being sold to the Davenport, Rock Island and Northwestern. In 1984, the locomotive was sold to a grain elevator in Billings, MT where it remains today. 
Black River and Western Railroad Lehigh Valley 112, is preserved on the BR&W in operational condition. And PRR 9206 preserved and in service.
Boston and Maine 1109 is preserved at the Railroad Museum of New England.
BRMX 1849, built as Boston and Maine 1113, is preserved at the Berkshire Scenic Railway, in Lenox, MA.
Cargill 6751, built in 1940 with construction number 1111, was one of the first SW1s that Electro-Motive built. After buying the unit, the Baltimore and Ohio Railroad (B&O) initially numbered the locomotive as No. 213, but subsequently changed the number to 8413. Leased by the Washington and Old Dominion Railroad in 1968, B&O 8413 was one of the last locomotives to operate on the W&OD before the railroad closed during the same year. After several transfers of ownership, the locomotive was acquired by Cargill, becoming Cargill No. 6751. Cargill moved the locomotive to Ogden, Utah in 1993 for use in the company's Globe Mill. Following Cargill's donation of the locomotive in 2010, the Utah Central Railway and the Union Pacific Railroad delivered it on May 21, 2011, to the Utah State Railroad Museum for display at Union Station in Ogden.
Commonwealth Edison 15 is preserved at the Illinois Railway Museum. This unit is in operating condition and is one of the most frequently used diesels on the property.
Heart of Dixie 904, built as Memphis Union Station 10, is preserved at the Heart of Dixie Railroad Museum.
Holly Sugar 1, the first SW1 built by EMC in 1939 is now preserved at the California State Railroad Museum in Sacramento, California. Built as Southern Pacific Lines 1000, the locomotive worked for the SP until its retirement in the 1970’s, then was sold to Holly Sugar and renumbered to 1. The museum donation was a coordinated effort between the museum, the Pacific Coast Chapter of the Railway and Locomotive Historical Society and Spreckels Sugar (the locomotive's last owner).
Louisville & Nashville 13 is on display at the Foley Railroad Museum in Foley, AL.
Milwaukee Road 1626 is preserved at the Milwaukee Road Heritage Center. It was formerly Northern States Power X-5, Ex-Burlington Northern 79, Exx- Chicago Burlington & Quincy 9137. Built in June 1939, the locomotive is in running condition, with its original Electro-Motive Division 6-567B-1 Prime Mover.
Monon Railroad 50, the first diesel locomotive owned by the Monon, is leased to the Hoosier Valley Railroad Museum. It was damaged in the move to the new home of the Indiana Transportation Museum in Logansport, Indiana. ITM also had Milwaukee Road 1613, but it was scrapped in July 2018. The locomotive was moved from Logansport, Indiana to the Hoosier Valley Railroad Museum in North Judson, Indiana in April 2021, where it will be repaired and will join the HVRM's fleet of vintage diesel locomotives. 
New York Central 705, built as Louisville and Nashville 14, is preserved in operational condition at the Adirondack Scenic Railroad.
Northern States Power 4 is preserved in operational condition at the Gopher State Railway Museum. It was originally built as CB&Q 9146 in May 1940.
Peabody Coal Company 470 (Former Delaware, Lackawanna and Western #436) is on static display at the Museum of the Coal Industry in Lynnville, Indiana.
Pennsylvania Railroad 9206 is preserved in operational condition on the Black River and Western Railroad.
Pennsylvania Railroad 9408 is preserved in operational condition at the Railway Museum of Greater Cincinnati.
Pere Marquette Railway 11 is preserved at the Baltimore & Ohio Railroad Museum, in Baltimore, MD, in operating condition at last report.
Portland Traction Company 100 is preserved in operational condition at the Oregon Rail Heritage Center.
Sacramento Northern 402, originally built as Western Pacific 502, is preserved at the California State Railroad Museum.
SMS Rail Service 9423, former Pennsylvania Railroad 9423, is in storage in Bridgeport, NJ.
Southern Pacific Lines 1006 is preserved in operational condition, restored to its as-built appearance. It resides at the Southern California Railway Museum, (formerly known as the Orange Empire Railway Museum) and frequently pulls passenger trains for museum visitors.
Western Pacific Railroad 501, originally built as EMC demonstrator 906, is preserved at the Western Pacific Railroad Museum at Portola, CA. This locomotive was the Western Pacific's first diesel-electric engine.
Used locomotive dealer/lessor Western Rail, Inc. owns WRIX 1001 (built 06/1949 as NYC # 609 (2nd), later renumbered NYC 8435, PC 8435, CR 8435, GE Sayre Repair Shop # 2, IRLX 1006, IRLX 1001, WCTR 1001).
Wilmington and Western Railroad 114, built as Lehigh Valley 114, is preserved and operates tourist trains on the W&W.
 The Zanesville & Western Scenic Railroad 8599, former PRR 5999, operations excursions on its scenic line in Fultonham, Ohio.
Dura-Bond (former owner of Turtle Creek Industrial Railroad) operates 462 at its pipe mill in McKeesport, PA.  It is well maintained and operates as a switcher on about 7 miles of private track.

See also 
 List of GM-EMD locomotives

Notes

References 
 
 
 (July 2005), "Preservation Briefs", Trains Magazine, p. 71.
 TrainWeb.com. The Unofficial EMD homepage. Retrieved on January 7, 2005. Contains fairly complete builders' records for early EMD production.
 Andersen Windows 3110.  Retrieved on December 7, 2012
 EMD Product Reference Data Card dated January 1, 1959 has the 567AC engine data used in the as-built roster.
 Billings Grain Terminal 84, https://www.stjohnsrail.com/restore84

External links 
 

B-B locomotives
SW0001
Diesel-electric locomotives of the United States
Railway locomotives introduced in 1938
Standard gauge locomotives of the United States
Standard gauge locomotives of Mexico
Diesel-electric locomotives of Mexico
Shunting locomotives